Ksenia Leonidovna Khairova (née Talyzina; March 29, 1969) is a Soviet and Russian stage and film actress.

Biography

Early life 
She was born in Moscow on March 29, 1969. Her parents were artist  Leonid Nepomnyashchy  and actress Valentina Talyzina who were divorced shortly after her birth.

She went to school with in-depth study of foreign languages, and now knows three languages.

In 1990 she graduated GITIS (Yevgeni Lazarev's rate).

Career 
She began her acting work in 1990, playing a small role in the movie  Nikolai Vavilov.

Since 1993 she is an actress TSATRA and now largely plays in TV series.

Personal life 
She is divorced from Khairov and has his child, daughter Anastasia Talyzina  (born in 1998). Second husband —  Yuri.

Selected filmography 
 1975 —  Afonya  as daughter
 1990 —  Nikolai Vavilov  as episode 
 1992 —  Our American Borya    as Anna 
 1997 —  At the Dawn of a Misty Youth  as  Anna 
 2004 —  Opera. The Chronicles of slaughter   as   episode 
 2005 —  You are My Happiness as Alexandra Fyodorovna 
 2006 —  Airport-2  as Svetlana 
 2006 —  Detectives 5  as Tatyana Totsiltsina 
 2006-2007 —  Race for Happiness  as Larisa Dronova 
 2007 — Daughters-Mothers  as Natalya 
 2008 —  Life Which was Not  as wife of foreigners 
 2008 —  Hour of Volkov 2  as  Lyudmila Tikhomirova 
 2009 —  City of Temptations   as Olga Diamond 
 2009 —  Given Circumstances  as Regina Sergeyevna 
 2009 —  Footprints in the Sand as Nadezhda 
 2009 —  Trace   as Alyona Pimenova
 2010 —  Vote  as Marina Ryabova 
 2010 —  Love and Gold as  episode 
 2010-2011 —  Institute for Noble Ladies  as Lidia Sokolova 
 2013-2018 — SashaTanya  as Izolda Venediktovna, psychologist

References

External links 
 

1969 births
Living people
Russian Academy of Theatre Arts alumni
Soviet film actresses
Soviet television actresses
Soviet stage actresses
Russian film actresses
Russian television actresses
Russian stage actresses